Steel is an alloy of iron and carbon with improved strength and fracture resistance compared to other forms of iron. Many other elements may be present or added. Stainless steels that are corrosion- and oxidation-resistant typically need an additional 11% chromium. Because of its high tensile strength and low cost, steel is used in buildings, infrastructure, tools, ships, trains, cars, machines, electrical appliances, and weapons.

Iron is the base metal of steel. Depending on the temperature, it can take two crystalline forms (allotropic forms): body-centred cubic and face-centred cubic. The interaction of the allotropes of iron with the alloying elements, primarily carbon, gives steel and cast iron their range of unique properties. In pure iron, the crystal structure has relatively little resistance to the iron atoms slipping past one another, and so pure iron is quite ductile, or soft and easily formed. In steel, small amounts of carbon, other elements, and inclusions within the iron act as hardening agents that prevent the movement of dislocations.

The carbon in typical steel alloys may contribute up to 2.14% of its weight. Varying the amount of carbon and many other alloying elements, as well as controlling their chemical and physical makeup in the final steel (either as solute elements, or as precipitated phases), impedes the movement of the dislocations that make pure iron ductile, and thus controls and enhances its qualities. These qualities include the hardness, quenching behaviour, need for annealing, tempering behaviour, yield strength, and tensile strength of the resulting steel. The increase in steel's strength compared to pure iron is possible only by reducing iron's ductility.

Steel was produced in bloomery furnaces for thousands of years, but its large-scale, industrial use began only after more efficient production methods were devised in the 17th century, with the introduction of the blast furnace and production of crucible steel. This was followed by the open-hearth furnace and then the Bessemer process in England in the mid-19th century. With the invention of the Bessemer process, a new era of mass-produced steel began. Mild steel replaced wrought iron. The German states saw major steel prowess over Europe in the 19th century.

Further refinements in the process, such as basic oxygen steelmaking (BOS), largely replaced earlier methods by further lowering the cost of production and increasing the quality of the final product. Today, steel is one of the most commonly manufactured materials in the world, with more than 1.6 billion tons produced annually. Modern steel is generally identified by various grades defined by assorted standards organisations. The modern steel industry is one of the largest manufacturing industries in the world, but also one of the most energy and greenhouse gas emission intense industries, contributing 8% of global emissions. However, steel is also very reusable: it is one of the world's most-recycled materials, with a recycling rate of over 60% globally.

Definitions and related materials

The noun steel originates from the Proto-Germanic adjective stahliją or stakhlijan 'made of steel', which is related to stahlaz or stahliją 'standing firm'.

The carbon content of steel is between 0.002% and 2.14% by weight for plain carbon steel (iron-carbon alloys). Too little carbon content leaves (pure) iron quite soft, ductile, and weak. Carbon contents higher than those of steel make a brittle alloy commonly called pig iron. Alloy steel is steel to which other alloying elements have been intentionally added to modify the characteristics of steel. Common alloying elements include: manganese, nickel, chromium, molybdenum, boron, titanium, vanadium, tungsten, cobalt, and niobium. Additional elements, most frequently considered undesirable, are also important in steel: phosphorus, sulfur, silicon, and traces of oxygen, nitrogen, and copper.

Plain carbon-iron alloys with a higher than 2.1% carbon content are known as cast iron. With modern steelmaking techniques such as powder metal forming, it is possible to make very high-carbon (and other alloy material) steels, but such are not common. Cast iron is not malleable even when hot, but it can be formed by casting as it has a lower melting point than steel and good castability properties. Certain compositions of cast iron, while retaining the economies of melting and casting, can be heat treated after casting to make malleable iron or ductile iron objects. Steel is distinguishable from wrought iron (now largely obsolete), which may contain a small amount of carbon but large amounts of slag.

Material properties

Origins and production

Iron is commonly found in the Earth's crust in the form of an ore, usually an iron oxide, such as magnetite or hematite. Iron is extracted from iron ore by removing the oxygen through its combination with a preferred chemical partner such as carbon which is then lost to the atmosphere as carbon dioxide. Small quantities of iron were smelted in ancient times, in the solid-state, by heating the ore in a charcoal fire and then welding the clumps together with a hammer and in the process squeezing out the impurities. With care, the carbon content could be controlled by moving it around in the fire. Unlike copper and tin, liquid or solid iron dissolves carbon quite readily.

All of these temperatures could be reached with ancient methods used since the Bronze Age. Since the oxidation rate of iron increases rapidly beyond , it is important that smelting take place in a low-oxygen environment. Smelting, using carbon to reduce iron oxides, results in an alloy (pig iron) that retains too much carbon to be called steel. The excess carbon and other impurities are removed in a subsequent step.

Other materials are often added to the iron/carbon mixture to produce steel with the desired properties. Nickel and manganese in steel add to its tensile strength and make the austenite form of the iron-carbon solution more stable, chromium increases hardness and melting temperature, and vanadium also increases hardness while making it less prone to metal fatigue.

To inhibit corrosion, at least 11% chromium can be added to steel so that a hard oxide forms on the metal surface; this is known as stainless steel. Tungsten slows the formation of cementite, keeping carbon in the iron matrix and allowing martensite to preferentially form at slower quench rates, resulting in high-speed steel. The addition of lead and sulfur decrease grain size, thereby making the steel easier to turn, but also more brittle and prone to corrosion. Such alloys are nevertheless frequently used for components such as nuts, bolts, and washers in applications where toughness and corrosion resistance are not paramount. For the most part, however, p-block elements such as sulfur, nitrogen, phosphorus, and lead are considered contaminants that make steel more brittle and are therefore removed from steel during the melting processing.

Properties

Even in a narrow range of concentrations of mixtures of carbon and iron that make steel, several different metallurgical structures, with very different properties can form. Understanding such properties is essential to making quality steel. At room temperature, the most stable form of pure iron is the body-centred cubic (BCC) structure called alpha iron or α-iron. The inclusion of carbon in alpha iron is called ferrite. At 910 °C, pure iron transforms into a face-centred cubic (FCC) structure, called gamma iron or γ-iron. The inclusion of carbon in gamma iron is called austenite. When carbon moves out of solution with iron, it forms a very hard, but brittle material called cementite (Fe3C).

When steels with exactly 0.8% carbon (known as a eutectoid steel), are cooled, the austenitic phase (FCC) of the mixture attempts to revert to the ferrite phase (BCC). The carbon no longer fits within the FCC austenite structure, resulting in an excess of carbon. One way for carbon to leave the austenite is for it to precipitate out of solution as cementite, leaving behind a surrounding phase of BCC iron called ferrite with a small percentage of carbon in solution. The two, ferrite and cementite, precipitate simultaneously producing a layered structure called pearlite, named for its resemblance to mother of pearl. In a hypereutectoid composition (greater than 0.8% carbon), the carbon will first precipitate out as large inclusions of cementite at the austenite grain boundaries until the percentage of carbon in the grains has decreased to the eutectoid composition (0.8% carbon), at which point the pearlite structure forms. For steels that have less than 0.8% carbon (hypoeutectoid), ferrite will first form within the grains until the remaining composition rises to 0.8% of carbon, at which point the pearlite structure will form. No large inclusions of cementite will form at the boundaries in hypoeuctoid steel. The above assumes that the cooling process is very slow, allowing enough time for the carbon to migrate.

As the rate of cooling is increased the carbon will have less time to migrate to form carbide at the grain boundaries but will have increasingly large amounts of pearlite of a finer and finer structure within the grains; hence the carbide is more widely dispersed and acts to prevent slip of defects within those grains, resulting in hardening of the steel. At the very high cooling rates produced by quenching, the carbon has no time to migrate but is locked within the face-centred austenite and forms martensite. Martensite is a highly strained and stressed, supersaturated form of carbon and iron and is exceedingly hard but brittle. Depending on the carbon content, the martensitic phase takes different forms. Below 0.2% carbon, it takes on a ferrite BCC crystal form, but at higher carbon content it takes a body-centred tetragonal (BCT) structure. There is no thermal activation energy for the transformation from austenite to martensite. There is no compositional change so the atoms generally retain their same neighbors.

Martensite has a lower density (it expands during the cooling) than does austenite, so that the transformation between them results in a change of volume. In this case, expansion occurs. Internal stresses from this expansion generally take the form of compression on the crystals of martensite and tension on the remaining ferrite, with a fair amount of shear on both constituents. If quenching is done improperly, the internal stresses can cause a part to shatter as it cools. At the very least, they cause internal work hardening and other microscopic imperfections. It is common for quench cracks to form when steel is water quenched, although they may not always be visible.

Heat treatment

There are many types of heat treating processes available to steel. The most common are annealing, quenching, and tempering.

Annealing is the process of heating the steel to a sufficiently high temperature to relieve local internal stresses. It does not create a general softening of the product but only locally relieves strains and stresses locked up within the material. Annealing goes through three phases: recovery, recrystallization, and grain growth. The temperature required to anneal a particular steel depends on the type of annealing to be achieved and the alloying constituents.

Quenching involves heating the steel to create the austenite phase then quenching it in water or oil. This rapid cooling results in a hard but brittle martensitic structure. The steel is then tempered, which is just a specialized type of annealing, to reduce brittleness. In this application the annealing (tempering) process transforms some of the martensite into cementite, or spheroidite and hence it reduces the internal stresses and defects. The result is a more ductile and fracture-resistant steel.

Production

When iron is smelted from its ore, it contains more carbon than is desirable. To become steel, it must be reprocessed to reduce the carbon to the correct amount, at which point other elements can be added. In the past, steel facilities would cast the raw steel product into ingots which would be stored until use in further refinement processes that resulted in the finished product. In modern facilities, the initial product is close to the final composition and is continuously cast into long slabs, cut and shaped into bars and extrusions and heat treated to produce a final product. Today, approximately 96% of steel is continuously cast, while only 4% is produced as ingots.

The ingots are then heated in a soaking pit and hot rolled into slabs, billets, or blooms. Slabs are hot or cold rolled into sheet metal or plates. Billets are hot or cold rolled into bars, rods, and wire. Blooms are hot or cold rolled into structural steel, such as I-beams and rails. In modern steel mills these processes often occur in one assembly line, with ore coming in and finished steel products coming out. Sometimes after a steel's final rolling, it is heat treated for strength; however, this is relatively rare.

History

Ancient

Steel was known in antiquity and was produced in bloomeries and crucibles.

The earliest known production of steel is seen in pieces of ironware excavated from an archaeological site in Anatolia (Kaman-Kalehöyük) and are nearly 4,000 years old, dating from 1800 BC. Horace identifies steel weapons such as the falcata in the Iberian Peninsula, while Noric steel was used by the Roman military.

The reputation of Seric iron of India (wootz steel) grew considerably in the rest of the world. Metal production sites in Sri Lanka employed wind furnaces driven by the monsoon winds, capable of producing high-carbon steel. Large-scale Wootz steel production in India using crucibles occurred by the sixth century BC, the pioneering precursor to modern steel production and metallurgy.

The Chinese of the Warring States period (403–221 BC) had quench-hardened steel, while Chinese of the Han dynasty (202 BC—AD 220) created steel by melting together wrought iron with cast iron, thus producing a carbon-intermediate steel by the 1st century AD.

There is evidence that carbon steel was made in Western Tanzania by the ancestors of the Haya people as early as 2,000 years ago by a complex process of "pre-heating" allowing temperatures inside a furnace to reach 1300 to 1400 °C.

Wootz and Damascus

Evidence of the earliest production of high carbon steel in India is found in Kodumanal in Tamil Nadu, the Golconda area in Andhra Pradesh and Karnataka, and in the Samanalawewa, Dehigaha Alakanda, areas of Sri Lanka. This came to be known as Wootz steel, produced in South India by about the sixth century BC and exported globally. The steel technology existed prior to 326 BC in the region as they are mentioned in literature of Sangam Tamil, Arabic, and Latin as the finest steel in the world exported to the Romans, Egyptian, Chinese and Arab worlds at that time – what they called Seric Iron. A 200 BC Tamil trade guild in Tissamaharama, in the South East of Sri Lanka, brought with them some of the oldest iron and steel artifacts and production processes to the island from the classical period. The Chinese and locals in Anuradhapura, Sri Lanka had also adopted the production methods of creating Wootz steel from the Chera Dynasty Tamils of South India by the 5th century AD. In Sri Lanka, this early steel-making method employed a unique wind furnace, driven by the monsoon winds, capable of producing high-carbon steel. Since the technology was acquired from the Tamilians from South India, the origin of steel technology in India can be conservatively estimated at 400–500 BC.

The manufacture of what came to be called Wootz, or Damascus steel, famous for its durability and ability to hold an edge, may have been taken by the Arabs from Persia, who took it from India. It was originally created from several different materials including various trace elements, apparently ultimately from the writings of Zosimos of Panopolis. In 327 BC, Alexander the Great was rewarded by the defeated King Porus, not with gold or silver but with 30 pounds of steel. A recent study has speculated that carbon nanotubes were included in its structure, which might explain some of its legendary qualities, though, given the technology of that time, such qualities were produced by chance rather than by design. Natural wind was used where the soil containing iron was heated by the use of wood. The ancient Sinhalese managed to extract a ton of steel for every 2 tons of soil, a remarkable feat at the time. One such furnace was found in Samanalawewa and archaeologists were able to produce steel as the ancients did.

Crucible steel, formed by slowly heating and cooling pure iron and carbon (typically in the form of charcoal) in a crucible, was produced in Merv by the 9th to 10th century AD. In the 11th century, there is evidence of the production of steel in Song China using two techniques: a "berganesque" method that produced inferior, inhomogeneous steel, and a precursor to the modern Bessemer process that used partial decarbonization via repeated forging under a cold blast.

Modern

Since the 17th century, the first step in European steel production has been the smelting of iron ore into pig iron in a blast furnace. Originally employing charcoal, modern methods use coke, which has proven more economical.

Processes starting from bar iron

In these processes, pig iron was refined (fined) in a finery forge to produce bar iron, which was then used in steel-making.

The production of steel by the cementation process was described in a treatise published in Prague in 1574 and was in use in Nuremberg from 1601. A similar process for case hardening armor and files was described in a book published in Naples in 1589. The process was introduced to England in about 1614 and used to produce such steel by Sir Basil Brooke at Coalbrookdale during the 1610s.

The raw material for this process were bars of iron. During the 17th century, it was realized that the best steel came from oregrounds iron of a region north of Stockholm, Sweden. This was still the usual raw material source in the 19th century, almost as long as the process was used.

Crucible steel is steel that has been melted in a crucible rather than having been forged, with the result that it is more homogeneous. Most previous furnaces could not reach high enough temperatures to melt the steel. The early modern crucible steel industry resulted from the invention of Benjamin Huntsman in the 1740s. Blister steel (made as above) was melted in a crucible or in a furnace, and cast (usually) into ingots.

Processes starting from pig iron

The modern era in steelmaking began with the introduction of Henry Bessemer's process in 1855, the raw material for which was pig iron. His method let him produce steel in large quantities cheaply, thus mild steel came to be used for most purposes for which wrought iron was formerly used. The Gilchrist-Thomas process (or basic Bessemer process) was an improvement to the Bessemer process, made by lining the converter with a basic material to remove phosphorus.

Another 19th-century steelmaking process was the Siemens-Martin process, which complemented the Bessemer process. It consisted of co-melting bar iron (or steel scrap) with pig iron.

These methods of steel production were rendered obsolete by the Linz-Donawitz process of basic oxygen steelmaking (BOS), developed in 1952, and other oxygen steel making methods. Basic oxygen steelmaking is superior to previous steelmaking methods because the oxygen pumped into the furnace limited impurities, primarily nitrogen, that previously had entered from the air used, and because, with respect to the open hearth process, the same quantity of steel from a BOS process is manufactured in one-twelfth the time. Today, electric arc furnaces (EAF) are a common method of reprocessing scrap metal to create new steel. They can also be used for converting pig iron to steel, but they use a lot of electrical energy (about 440 kWh per metric ton), and are thus generally only economical when there is a plentiful supply of cheap electricity.

Industry

The steel industry is often considered an indicator of economic progress, because of the critical role played by steel in infrastructural and overall economic development. In 1980, there were more than 500,000 U.S. steelworkers. By 2000, the number of steelworkers had fallen to 224,000.

The economic boom in China and India caused a massive increase in the demand for steel. Between 2000 and 2005, world steel demand increased by 6%. Since 2000, several Indian and Chinese steel firms have risen to prominence, such as Tata Steel (which bought Corus Group in 2007), Baosteel Group and Shagang Group. , though, ArcelorMittal is the world's largest steel producer. In 2005, the British Geological Survey stated China was the top steel producer with about one-third of the world share; Japan, Russia, and the US followed respectively. The large production capacity of steel results also in a significant amount of carbon dioxide emissions inherent related to the main production route. In 2021, it was estimated that around 7% of the global greenhouse gas emissions resulted from the steel industry. Reduction of these emissions are expected to come from a shift in the main production route using cokes, more recycling of steel and the application of carbon capture and storage or carbon capture and utilization technology.

In 2008, steel began trading as a commodity on the London Metal Exchange. At the end of 2008, the steel industry faced a sharp downturn that led to many cut-backs.

Recycling

As more steel is produced than is scrapped, the amount of recycled raw materials is about 40% of the total of steel produced - in 2016,  of crude steel was produced globally, with  recycled.

Contemporary

Carbon 
Modern steels are made with varying combinations of alloy metals to fulfill many purposes. Carbon steel, composed simply of iron and carbon, accounts for 90% of steel production. Low alloy steel is alloyed with other elements, usually molybdenum, manganese, chromium, or nickel, in amounts of up to 10% by weight to improve the hardenability of thick sections. High strength low alloy steel has small additions (usually < 2% by weight) of other elements, typically 1.5% manganese, to provide additional strength for a modest price increase.

Recent Corporate Average Fuel Economy (CAFE) regulations have given rise to a new variety of steel known as Advanced High Strength Steel (AHSS). This material is both strong and ductile so that vehicle structures can maintain their current safety levels while using less material. There are several commercially available grades of AHSS, such as dual-phase steel, which is heat treated to contain both a ferritic and martensitic microstructure to produce a formable, high strength steel. Transformation Induced Plasticity (TRIP) steel involves special alloying and heat treatments to stabilize amounts of austenite at room temperature in normally austenite-free low-alloy ferritic steels. By applying strain, the austenite undergoes a phase transition to martensite without the addition of heat. Twinning Induced Plasticity (TWIP) steel uses a specific type of strain to increase the effectiveness of work hardening on the alloy.

Carbon Steels are often galvanized, through hot-dip or electroplating in zinc for protection against rust.

Alloy 
 

Stainless steels contain a minimum of 11% chromium, often combined with nickel, to resist corrosion. Some stainless steels, such as the ferritic stainless steels are magnetic, while others, such as the austenitic, are nonmagnetic. Corrosion-resistant steels are abbreviated as CRES.

Alloy steels are plain-carbon steels in which small amounts of alloying elements like chromium and vanadium have been added. Some more modern steels include tool steels, which are alloyed with large amounts of tungsten and cobalt or other elements to maximize solution hardening. This also allows the use of precipitation hardening and improves the alloy's temperature resistance. Tool steel is generally used in axes, drills, and other devices that need a sharp, long-lasting cutting edge. Other special-purpose alloys include weathering steels such as Cor-ten, which weather by acquiring a stable, rusted surface, and so can be used un-painted. Maraging steel is alloyed with nickel and other elements, but unlike most steel contains little carbon (0.01%). This creates a very strong but still malleable steel.

Eglin steel uses a combination of over a dozen different elements in varying amounts to create a relatively low-cost steel for use in bunker buster weapons. Hadfield steel (after Sir Robert Hadfield) or manganese steel contains 12–14% manganese which when abraded strain-hardens to form a very hard skin which resists wearing. Examples include tank tracks, bulldozer blade edges, and cutting blades on the jaws of life.

Standards 
Most of the more commonly used steel alloys are categorized into various grades by standards organizations. For example, the Society of Automotive Engineers has a series of grades defining many types of steel. The American Society for Testing and Materials has a separate set of standards, which define alloys such as A36 steel, the most commonly used structural steel in the United States. The JIS also defines a series of steel grades that are being used extensively in Japan as well as in developing countries.

Uses

Iron and steel are used widely in the construction of roads, railways, other infrastructure, appliances, and buildings. Most large modern structures, such as stadiums and skyscrapers, bridges, and airports, are supported by a steel skeleton. Even those with a concrete structure employ steel for reinforcing. It sees widespread use in major appliances and cars. Despite the growth in usage of aluminium, steel is still the main material for car bodies. Steel is used in a variety of other construction materials, such as bolts, nails and screws and other household products and cooking utensils.

Other common applications include shipbuilding, pipelines, mining, offshore construction, aerospace, white goods (e.g. washing machines), heavy equipment such as bulldozers, office furniture, steel wool, tool, and armour in the form of personal vests or vehicle armour (better known as rolled homogeneous armour in this role).

Historical

Before the introduction of the Bessemer process and other modern production techniques, steel was expensive and was only used where no cheaper alternative existed, particularly for the cutting edge of knives, razors, swords, and other items where a hard, sharp edge was needed. It was also used for springs, including those used in clocks and watches.

With the advent of speedier and thriftier production methods, steel has become easier to obtain and much cheaper. It has replaced wrought iron for a multitude of purposes. However, the availability of plastics in the latter part of the 20th century allowed these materials to replace steel in some applications due to their lower fabrication cost and weight. Carbon fiber is replacing steel in some cost insensitive applications such as sports equipment and high-end automobiles.

Long

 As reinforcing bars and mesh in reinforced concrete
 Railroad tracks
 Structural steel in modern buildings and bridges
 Wires
 Input to reforging applications

Flat carbon
 Major appliances
 Magnetic cores
 The inside and outside body of automobiles, trains, and ships.

Weathering (COR-TEN)

 Intermodal containers
 Outdoor sculptures
 Architecture
 Highliner train cars

Stainless

 Cutlery
 Rulers
 Surgical instruments
 Watches
 Guns
 Rail passenger vehicles
 Tablets
 Trash Cans
 Body piercing jewellery
 Inexpensive rings
 Components of spacecraft and space stations

Low-background

Steel manufactured after World War II became contaminated with radionuclides by nuclear weapons testing. Low-background steel, steel manufactured prior to 1945, is used for certain radiation-sensitive applications such as Geiger counters and radiation shielding.

See also

 Bulat steel
 Carbon steel
 Damascus steel
 Galvanising
 Global steel industry trends
 Iron in folklore
 Knife metal
 Machinability
 Noric steel
 Pelletizing
 Rolling
 Rolling mill
 Rust Belt
 Second Industrial Revolution
 Silicon steel
 Steel abrasive
 Steel mill
 Tamahagane, used in Japanese swords
 Tinplate
 Toledo steel
 Wootz steel

References

Bibliography
 
 
 
 
 
 
 Verein Deutscher Eisenhüttenleute (Ed.). Steel – A Handbook for Materials Research and Engineering, Volume 1: Fundamentals. Springer-Verlag Berlin, Heidelberg and Verlag Stahleisen, Düsseldorf 1992, 737 p. .
 Verein Deutscher Eisenhüttenleute (Ed.). Steel – A Handbook for Materials Research and Engineering, Volume 2: Applications. Springer-Verlag Berlin, Heidelberg and Verlag Stahleisen, Düsseldorf 1993, 839 pages, .

Further reading
 Mark Reutter, Making Steel: Sparrows Point and the Rise and Ruin of American Industrial Might. University of Illinois Press, 2005.
 Duncan Burn, The Economic History of Steelmaking, 1867–1939: A Study in Competition. Cambridge University Press, 1961.
 Harukiyu Hasegawa, The Steel Industry in Japan: A Comparison with Britain. Routledge, 1996.
 J.C. Carr and W. Taplin, History of the British Steel Industry. Harvard University Press, 1962.
 H. Lee Scamehorn, Mill & Mine: The Cf&I in the Twentieth Century. University of Nebraska Press, 1992.
 Warren, Kenneth, Big Steel: The First Century of the United States Steel Corporation, 1901–2001. University of Pittsburgh Press, 2001.

External links

 Official website of the World Steel Association (worldsteel)
 steeluniversity.org: Online steel education resources, an initiative of World Steel Association
 Metallurgy for the Non-Metallurgist from the American Society for Metals
 MATDAT Database of Properties of Unalloyed, Low-Alloy and High-Alloy Steels – obtained from published results of material testing

 
2nd-millennium BC introductions
Building materials
Roofing materials